Saudi Arabia competed in the Olympic Games for the first time at the 1972 Summer Olympics in Munich, West Germany.

Results by events

Athletics
Men's 100 metres
Mansour Farhan Al-Gegd
 First Heat — 11.23s (→ did not advance)

Men's 1500 metres
Naser Al-Safraa
 Heat — 4:14.5 (→ did not advance)

Men's 5000 metres
Abdallah Rouei Al-Mabrouk
 Heat — 13:51.0 (→ did not advance)

Men's 4 × 100 m Relay
Mohamed Al-Dosary, Mansour Farhan Al-Gegd, Bilal Said, and Saad Khalil Al-Dosary 
 Heat — 43.35s (→ did not advance)

References
Official Olympic Reports

Nations at the 1972 Summer Olympics
1972
1972 in Saudi Arabian sport